Romeo Fernandes (born 6 July 1992) is an Indian professional footballer who plays as a winger for Indian Super League club East Bengal.

Early life and education
Romeo Fernandes was born on 6 July 1992 in Assolna, Goa. He did his schooling at Regina Martyrum High School.

Career

Dempo
Romeo was scouted by Dempo youth team scout Joaquim Crasto in 2010, joining the club's youth team the same year. He was a key player for the Dempo's youth teams at U18, U19 and U20 levels. Dempo loaned out Romeo to Margao SC in the Goa Second Division where he helped Margao to promotion to the Goa Professional League in 2011. Back at Dempo for the 2011–12 I-League, he made his professional senior team debut the same season while he would also make 8 appearances, scoring 7 times during the 2012 I-League U20 Romeo registered his first I-League assist for Dempo on 28 November 2012 against Mohun Bagan, assisting Joaquim Abranches in the 40th minute for the first goal of the match in a 3–0 win.

FC Goa (loan)
Romeo joined FC Goa on loan for the 2014 Indian Super League. On 22 November, Romeo scored his first goal for the club in a 2–0 win over Pune City, starting in place of the injured Robert Pires and opening the scoring in the fifth minute with a glancing header. On 1 December 2014, he again found the net, in the 33rd minute, opening the scoring in a 3–0 against NorthEast United which also happened to be the 100th goal of the 2014 season. He scored his third goal for his team in a 3–1 win away at Chennaiyin, the latter's first home defeat of the season. Fernandes' impressive performances led to high praise from FC Goa coach and Brazilian legend Zico as well as interest from Brazilian club Atlético Paranaense.

Return to Dempo
On 29 December Fernandes scored on his return to Dempo in the group stage of the 2014–15 Federation Cup, heading in the only goal of the game from Tolgay Özbey's cross in the 40th minute. Romeo scored his second goal of the cup against Sporting Goa during a 4–1 win. He had a fantastic Federation Cup, scoring 4 goals in 6 matches. Romeo started Dempo's first game of the 2014–15 season but was injured early on in the game and replaced.

Atlético Paranaense (loan)
Romeo joined Atlético Paranaense on 15 February 2015 on loan from parent club Dempo until the end of June 2015, initially joining the U-23 team that competes in the state of Parana. Atletico PR has the option to renew the contract until December 2015 and thereafter has the option to buy the player from Dempo. Romeo was promoted to the senior team by the new coach of Atletico PR, Enderson Moreira after impressing in training. He made his debut for Atletico Paranaenese on 3 May in the Campeonato Paranaense against Nacional PR in the local state competition in the state of Parana, where Atletico Paranaense are located, coming on for Rafinha in the 67th Minute as a substitute in a 5–0 win for his team, and thus becoming the first Indian to play in South America professionally at a senior level.

Return to Goa

On 25 May 2015, it was announced that Atlético Paranaense had released Romeo and that he would re-join FC Goa for the 2015 Indian Super League season. On 6 December 2015, Fernandes scored twice against Delhi Dynamos as FC Goa came from 2–0 down to win 3–2.

He joined Goa for the 2016 Indian Super League season. On 11 November 2016, he assisted and scored a goal in the 94th–minute to give Goa a 2–1 victory over NorthEast United and also their first home win of the season.

East Bengal (loan)
On 1 January 2017, Romeo joined East Bengal on loan for the remaining 2016–17 I-League season.

Delhi Dynamos
Delhy Dynamos signed Romeo in the 2017–18 Indian Super League season player draft for domestic players. On 27 March 2018, he signed a two-year contract extension with club.

AFC Champions League with Goa
On 7 April 2021, after trials with the club, Romeo was named in FC Goa's 28-man squad for 2021 AFC Champions League He featured in Goa's second group stage game against Al-Rayyan.

East Bengal
On 31 August 2021, Romeo joined East Bengal on a one-year deal ahead of the 2021–22 Indian Super League season.

International
After good performances in the 2012 I-League U20 season, Romeo was called up to the India U23 team for the 2013 AFC U22 Qualifiers in Oman. He made his debut for the under-23 team on 28 June 2012 against the United Arab Emirates U22, coming on as a 49th-minute substitute for Shaiju Mon and would score the equalizer in the 87th minute as India U23 went on to draw the match 1–1. Romeo scored his 2nd goal of the tournament against Turkmenistan U22 in a 4–1 win.

Romeo became the 500th player to debut for the senior Indian team against Guam in a Group D 2018 FIFA World Cup qualifier on 12 November 2015.

Career statistics

Club

Honours
Dempo
I-League
 Champion (1): 2011–12
'''I-League 2nd Division
 Champion (1): 2015–16

See also
 List of Indian football players in foreign leagues

References

1992 births
Living people
Indian footballers
India international footballers
Footballers from Goa
People from South Goa district
I-League players
Dempo SC players
Indian Super League players
FC Goa players
East Bengal Club players
Indian expatriate footballers
Indian expatriate sportspeople in Brazil
Club Athletico Paranaense players
Expatriate footballers in Brazil
India youth international footballers
Association football wingers